Ciputat is a district in the city of South Tangerang, Banten, Indonesia and is inside the Greater Jakarta metropolitan area. It covers an area of 18.38 km2 and its population at the 2020 Census was 208,722.

Ciputat Timur ("East Ciputat") is a separate administrative district of South Tangerang, situated to the east of Ciputat. It covers an area of 15.43 km2 and its population at the 2020 Census was 172,139.

Education 
Syarif Hidayatullah State Islamic University Jakarta

References

South Tangerang
Populated places in Banten